Harry Corday Coleman (born November 10, 1985) is a former gridiron football linebacker, last with the Edmonton Eskimos of the Canadian Football League. He played college  football at LSU as a safety and was switched to linebacker during his senior year. He signed with the New Orleans Saints as an undrafted free agent, but was subsequently released by the team on July 21, 2010. In high school Coleman played football, basketball, and baseball.  He was later re-signed by the Saints on August 14, 2010.  Coleman would ultimately be released again before he ended up in the United Football League. He signed with the Edmonton Eskimos on May 9, 2012, but was released on June 23, 2012. In 2018, Coleman was a member of the amateur flag football team Fighting Cancer during the American Flag Football League's first US Open of Football. Fighting Cancer was crowned the America's Champions for winning the amateur branch of the tournament and faced the Professional Champion team, Godspeed, in the Ultimate Final, which they also won.

References

External links
LSU Tigers bio
Just Sports Stats

1985 births
Living people
American football safeties
American football linebackers
Edmonton Elks players
Hartford Colonials players
LSU Tigers football players
New Orleans Saints players
People from Franklin, Louisiana